Nationality words link to articles with information on the nation's poetry or literature (for instance, Irish or France).

Events
 January 10 – T. S. Eliot marries his secretary Valerie Fletcher, almost 40 years his junior, in a private church ceremony.
 March 15 – Élet és Irodalom first published in Hungary as a literary magazine.
 March 25 – Copies of Allen Ginsberg's Howl and Other Poems (first published 1 November 1956) printed in England are seized by United States Customs Service officials in San Francisco on the grounds of obscenity. On October 3, in People v. Ferlinghetti, a subsequent prosecution of publisher Lawrence Ferlinghetti in the city, the work is ruled not to be obscene. The trial brings significant attention to the participants and other poets of the Beat Generation.
 Ginsberg surprises the literary world by abandoning San Francisco. After a spell in Morocco, he and Peter Orlovsky move to Paris, France, at the suggestion of Gregory Corso, who introduces them to a shabby lodging house above a bar at 9 rue Gît-le-Cœur kept by Mme Rachou, where they are soon joined by William S. Burroughs and others, including young painters, writers and black jazz musicians. The building becomes known as the "Beat Hotel". The writers' time here is a productive, creative period for many of them. Here, Ginsberg finishes his poem "Kaddish", Corso composes "Bomb" and "Marriage", and Burroughs (with Ginsberg and Corso's help) puts together the novel Naked Lunch from previous writings. Corso returns to New York in 1958; the "hotel" closes in 1963; and Ginsberg and Orlovsky leave for travels to India in 1967.
 Autumn – Black Mountain Review literary magazine folds.
 Shi'r ("Poetry") magazine is founded in Beirut by Syrian-born poets Yusuf al-Khal and 'Adunis'. The journal is a showcase for experimental Arabic poetry as well as translations of poetry from European languages.

Works published in English
Listed by nation where the work was first published and again by the poet's native land, if different; substantially revised works listed separately:

Canada
 Harry Ammos, Churchill and Other Poems
 Dick Diespecker, Windows West
 Joan Finnegan, through The Glass, Darkly
 Northrop Frye, Anatomy of Criticism: Four Essays, literary theory (Princeton University Press)
 Eldon Grier, The Ring of Ice
 Daryl Hine, The Carnal and the Crane
 D. G. Jones, Frost on the Sun
 Gordon Leclaire, Carpenter's Apprentice
 Dorothy Livesay, Selected Poems, 1926-1956
 Goodridge Macdonald, Recent Poems
 Jay Macpherson, The Boatman
 Marjorie Pickthall, The Selected Poems of Marjorie Pickthall, Lorne Pierce ed. (Toronto: McClelland & Stewart)
 James Reaney, A Suit of Nettles
F. R. Scott, Events and Signals. Toronto: Ryerson Press.
 A. J. M. Smith ed.:
 The Book of Canadian Poetry, third revised edition (anthology)
 The Blasted Pine

India, in English
 Sri Aurobindo, posthumously published (died 1950):
 Ilion ( Poetry in English ), Pondicherry: Sri Aurobindo Ashram
 More Poems ( Poetry in English ), Pondicherry: Sri Aurobindo Ashram
 Nissim Ezekiel, A Time to Change and Other Poems ( Poetry in English )
 Dom Moraes, A Beginning ( Poetry in English )
 Manjeri Sundaraman, The Neem is a Lady and Other Poems ( Poetry in English ), Madras: Dhanus Pub.

New Zealand

 James K. Baxter, The Iron Breadboard: Studies in New Zealand Writing, a parody of 17 New Zealand poets, which some of his fellow poets greeted with acrimony 
 James K. Baxter, Charles Doyle, Louis Johnson and Kendrick Smithyman, The Night Shift: Poems on Aspects of Love, Wellington: Capricorn Press
 Charles Brasch: The Estate, and Other Poems, Christchurch: Caxton Press
 Allen Curnow, Poems 1949–57 
Louis Johnson, New Worlds for Old
 W. H. Oliver, Fire Without Phoenix: Poems 1946–1954, Christchurch: Caxton Press

United Kingdom
 Dannie Abse, Tenants of the House, London: Hutchinson
 W. H. Auden, The Old Man's Road, English native in the United States
 George Barker, Collected Poems 1930–1955
 Edmund Blunden, Poems of Many Years
 Norman Cameron, collected works (posthumous)
 Charles Causley, Union Street
 Austin Clarke, Too Great a Vine (see also Ancient Lights 1955, The Horse-Eaters 1960)
 Donald Davie, A Winter Talent, and Other Poems, London: Routledge and Kegan Paul
 C. Day-Lewis, Pegasus, and Other Poems
 Kenneth Fearing, New and Selected Poems
 Roy Fuller, Brutus's Orchard
 Thom Gunn, The Sense of Movement, London: Faber and Faber; University of Chicago Press
 Donald Hall, Robert Pack and Louis Simpson, New Poets of England and America, anthology (Meridian Books)
 Ted Hughes, The Hawk in the Rain, including "The Thought Fox", London: Faber and Faber; New York: Harper
 James Kirkup:
 The Descent into the Cave, and Other Poems
 The Prodigal Son
 Louis MacNeice, Visitations
 Norman MacCaig, The Sinai Sort, London: Hogarth Press
 Edith Sitwell, collected works
 Stevie Smith, Not Waving but Drowning
 Anthony Thwaite, Home Truths
 Terence Tiller, Reading a Medal
 C. A. Trypanis, The Stones of Troy

Criticism, scholarship and biography in the United Kingdom
 T. S. Eliot, On Poetry and Poets

United States
 W. H. Auden, The Old Man's Road, English native in the United States
 Philip Booth, Letter from a Distant Land
 Hilda Doolittle (H.D.), Selected Poems of H.D.
 Richard Eberhart, Great Praises
 Robert Fitzgerald, In the Rose of Time
 George Garrett, The Reverend Ghost
 Donald Hall, Robert Pack and Louis Simpson, New Poets of England and America, anthology (Meridian Books)
 Daryl Hine, The Carnal and the Crane
 Robert E. Howard, Always Comes Evening
 Denise Levertov, Here and Now, City Lights Books
 William Meredith, The Open Sea and Other Poems
 W. S. Merwin, Green with Beasts
 Marianne Moore, Like a Bulwark
 Howard Moss, A Swimmer in the Air
 Ogden Nash, You Can't Get There from Here
 Frank O'Hara, Meditations in an Emergency, Grove Press
 Kenneth Patchen, Hurrah for Anything
 Marie Ponsot, True Minds
 Kenneth Rexroth, In Defense of the Earth
 Kenneth Rexroth and Lawrence Ferlinghetti, LP record, Poetry Readings in the Cellar (with the Cellar Jazz Quintet): Kenneth Rexroth & Lawrence Ferlinghetti Fantasy #7002 LP (Spoken Word)
 Muriel Rukeyser, One Life
 May Sarton, In Time Like Air
 William Jay Smith, Poems 1947–1957
 Wallace Stevens, Opus Posthumous, edited by Samuel French Morse; includes Owl's Clover (poems first published in 1936) and essays, including "The Irrational Element in Poetry," "The Whole Man: Perspectives," "Horizons," "Preface to Time of Year," "John Crowe Ransom: Tennessean," and "Adagia", Knopf (posthumous)
 Robert Penn Warren, Promises: Poems 1954-1956
 Richard Wilbur, Poems 1943–1956
 James Wright, The Green Wall

Criticism, scholarship and biography in the United States
 Annotated Index to the Cantos of Ezra Pound, the first guide to Pound's Cantos
 William Carlos Williams, The Selected Letters of William Carlos Williams, edited by John C. Thirwall
 William Butler Yeats, Variorum Edition of the Poems of W.B. Yeats, edited by Peter Allt and Russell K. Alspach, New York: Macmillan (posthumous)

Other in English
 D. Stewart and N. Keesing, editors, Old Bush Songs and Rhymes of Colonial Times, anthology (Australia)

Works in other languages
Listed by language and often by nation where the work was first published and again by the poet's native land, if different; substantially revised works listed separately:

French language

Canada, in French
 Claude Fournier, Le Ciel fermé 
 Pierre Trotier, Poèmes de Russie
 Reginald Boisvert, Le Temps de vivre
 Maurice Beaulieu, À glaise fendre
 Jean-Guy Pilon, L'homme et le jour, Montréal: l'Hexagone
 Rina Lasnier, Présence de l'absence

France
 Alain Bosquet, Premier Testament
 Frances de Dalmatie, Anamorphose
 Jean Follain, Tout instant
 Fernand Gregh, Le mal du monde
 Philippe Jaccottet, La Promenade sous les arbres* 1957 * Pierre Jean Jouve, Mélodrame
 Alphonse Métérié, Ephémères
 Henri Michaux, L'infini turbulent (translated into English as Miserable Miracle), about his experiences taking mescaline
 Pierre Oster, Solitude de la lumière
 Saint-John Perse, pen name of Marie-René Alexis Saint-Léger, Amers ("Seamarks"), Paris: Gallimard
 Tristan Tzara, pen name of Sami Rosenstock, Frère bois
 Tchicaya U Tam'si, Feu de brousse

Germany
 Hans Magnus Enzensberger, Verteidigung der Wölfe (his debut work)
 Peter Gan, Schachbrett
 Doris Mühringer, Gedichte I
 Margot Scharpenberg, Gefährliche Uebung
 Benno von Weise, editor, Die deutsche Lyrik: Form und Geschichte. Interpretationen ("German poetry: Form and history. Interpretations"), two volumes, Düsseldorf (criticism)

Hebrew
 N. Alterman, Ir ha-Yona ("City of the Dove")
 Moses ibn Ezra, Shirai ha-Kodesh le-Moshe Ibn Ezra ("The Sacred Poems of Moses Ibn Ezra"), edited by Simon Bernstein, the first comprehensive collection
 Ephraim Lisitzky, Negohot ma-Arafel ("Light through the Mist")
 Yaakov Schteinberg, Kol Kitvai Yaakov Schteinberg ("Complete Works")
 Aaron Zeitlin, Ben ha-Esh ve-Hayesha ("Between Fire and Redemption")

India
Listed in alphabetical order by first name:
 Felix Paul Noronha, Motyam Har written in the Konkani dialect of the  Marathi language
 Sarachchandra Muktibodh, Yatrik, Marathi
 Subhas Mukhopadhyay, Phul Phutuk, Bengali

Portuguese language

Portugal
 Mário Cesariny de Vasconcelos, Pena Capital

Brazil

 Carlos Drummond de Andrade, Fala,amendoeira and Ciclo

Spanish language

Chile
 Gabriela Mistral, Recados: Contando a Chile, Santiago, Chile: Editorial del Pacífico
 Pablo Neruda:
 Viajes
 Nuevas odas elementales

Latin America
 Nellie Campobello, Tres poemas, Mexico
 Rosario Castellanos, Poemas (1953–1955)
 Arturo Corcuera, El grito del hombre, Peru
 Roque Dalton, Mía junto a los pájaros, San Salvador
 Jacinto Cordero Espinosa, Despojamiento
 Amado Nervo:
 complete poetic works, publisher: Aguilar
 Pensamientos, publisher: Barcelona
 Octavio Paz, Piedra de sol, Mexico
 César Vallejo, collected poems, posthumously published; Peru

Spain

 Vicente Aleixandre, Mis poemas mejores (1956)
 Gabriel Celaya, De claro en claro
 R. Montesino, La soledad y los días
 R. Pombo, Poesías completas
 María C. Lacaci, Humana voz (winner of the 1956 Adonaïs Prize)
 Jorge Guillén, "Lugar de Lázaro" (fragment of Clamor)
 Juan Ramón Jiménez:
 Libros en poesía
 Tercera antología poética

Spanish anthologies
 R. Menendez Pidal, editor, Espana y su historia
 J.M. Blecua, Floresta lírica espanola

Yiddish
 Yankev Glatshteyn, Fun mayn gantser mi ("Of All My Labor, Selected Poems, 1919-1956")
 A. Leyeles, Baym fus fun barg ("At the Foot of the Mountain")
 Khos Kliger, Peyzazhn fun Yisroel ("Israel Landscapes")

Other languages
 Eugenio Montale, La bufera e altro ("The Storm and Other Things"), a second, larger edition (original edition of 1,000 copies published in 1956), Milan: Arnaldo Mondadore Editore; Italy
 Máirtín Ó Direáin, Ó Mórna agus Dánta Eile, Irish
 Pier Paolo Pasolini, Le ceneri di Gramsci, Italy
 Wisława Szymborska, Wołanie do Yeti ("Calling Out to Yeti"), Poland

Awards and honors

Canada
 Governor General's Awards: Robert A.D. Ford, A Window on the North
 President's Medal for a single poem: Jay Macpherson, The Fisherman — A Book of Riddles

United Kingdom
 Queen's Gold Medal for Poetry: Siegfried Sassoon
 Guinness Poetry Awards: Vernon Watkins, The Tributary Seasons; Cecil Day-Lewis, Moods of Love; Roy Fuller, Seven Mythological Sonnets

United States
 National Book Award for Poetry: Richard Wilbur, Things of this World
 Pulitzer Prize for Poetry: Things of This World by Richard Wilbur
 Bollingen Prize: Allen Tate
 Fellowship of the Academy of American Poets: Conrad Aiken
 Robert Frost Fellowship in Poetry: May Swenson
 Yale Series of Younger Poets Award: James Wright for The Green Wall

Poetry Magazine awards
 Levinson Prize: Thom Gunn
 Oscar Blumenthal Prize: William Carlos Williams
 Eunice Tietjens Prize: James Wright
 Bess Hokin Prize: Philip Booth
 Union League Civic and Arts Foundation prize: Anne Ridler
 Vachel Lindsay Prize: 
 Harriet Monroe Memorial Prize: John Ciardi

Poetry Society of America awards
 Alexander Droutzkoy Memorial award: Mark Van Doren
 Walt Whitman Award: Fredson Bowers
 Reynolds Lyric Award: Frances Minturn Howard and David Ross
 Edna St. Vincent Millay Memorial Award: Richard Wilbur
 William Rose Benet Memorial Award]]: Babette Deutsch
 Ridgely Torrence Memorial Award: John Hall Wheelock
 Poetry Chap-Book Award: Grover Smith, Jr.
 Emily S. Hamblen Memorial Award: Trianon Press of Paris for a work on William Blake
 Arthur Davison Ficke Memorial Award: Margaret Haley Carpenter, Leah Bodine Drake, Frances Minturn Howard, Ulrich Troubetzkoy
 Leonora Speyer Memorial Award: Lois Smith Hiers
 Annual Award: Joyce Horner
 Borestone Mountain Poetry Award: Eric Barker

Other
 Fastenrath Prize (Spain) for the best poetry published in the past four years: J. García Nieto, La red

Births
Death years link to the corresponding "[year] in poetry" article:
 January 13 – Claudia Emerson (died 2014), American winner of the 2006 Pulitzer Prize for Poetry
 March 23 – Ananda Devi, Mauritian francophone fiction writer and poet
 April 16 – Essex Hemphill (died 1995), gay African-American poet and activist
 April 23 – Bruce Meyer, Canadian poet and educator
 August – Martín Espada, American poet and professor at the University of Massachusetts Amherst, where he teaches creative writing and Latino poetry.
 August 15 – Michael Hofmann, German-English poet and translator from German
 August 19 – Li-Young Lee, American poet born in Jakarta, Indonesia to Chinese parents
 October 17 – Uwe Kolbe, German
 October 21 – Attila the Stockbroker (John Baine), English punk and performance poet
 November 8 – Afua Cooper, Jamaican-born Canadian dub poet, sociologist and historian (migrates to Canada in 1980)
 November 12 – Malcolm Guite, Nigerian-born English poet, singer-songwriter, Anglican priest and academic
 December 12 – Brenda Marie Osbey, American
 Also:
 Cyrus Cassells, American
 Valerio Magrelli, Italian
 Anthony Molino, American poet, translator, anthropologist and psychoanalyst
 Sayed Hasmat Jalal, Bengali poet, short-story writer and journalist
 Oliver Reynolds, British
 Alan Riach, Scottish poet and academic
 Haris Vlavianos, Greek

Deaths
Birth years link to the corresponding "[year] in poetry" article:
 January 10 – Gabriela Mistral (Lucila Godoy Alcayaga), 67 (born 1889), Chilean poet, diplomat, educator and feminist, winner of the Nobel Prize in Literature in 1945)
 January 13
 A. E. Coppard (born 1878), English short story writer and poet
 Saishū Onoe 尾上柴舟 (born 1876), Japanese tanka poet and calligrapher
 February 13 – F. W. Harvey, 68 (born 1888), English rural poet and soldier
 April 22 – Roy Campbell, 56 (born 1901), South African poet and satirist
 March 11 – Jinzai Kiyoshi 神西清 (born 1903), Japanese, Shōwa period novelist, translator, literary critic, poet and playwright
 March 25 – A. R. D. Fairburn (born 1904), New Zealand poet
 March 28 – Christopher Morley, 66 (born 1890), American journalist, novelist and poet
 June 15 – Skipwith Cannell (born 1887), American poet associated with the Imagist group (pronounce his last name with the stress on the second syllable)
 August 4 – Ivan Zorman, 72 (born 1885), Slovene-born poet and composer
 August 13 – Joseph Warren Beach (born 1880), American author, book critic and educator
 August 26 – Umberto Saba, 74 (born 1883), Italian poet and fiction writer
 September 20 – Merrill Moore, 54 (born 1903), American psychiatrist and poet
 September 22 – Oliver St. John Gogarty, 79 (born 1878), Irish poet, writer, physician and ear surgeon, one of the most prominent Dublin wits, political figure of the Irish Free State, best known as the inspiration for Buck Mulligan in James Joyce's novel Ulysses, of a heart attack
 September 26 – Charles Badger Clark (born 1883), American poet
 October 23 – Mihai Codreanu (born 1876), Romanian
 October 26 – Nikos Kazantzakis (born 1883), Greek
 December 25 – Stanley Vestal (born 1877), American writer, poet and historian

See also

 Poetry
 List of poetry awards
 List of years in poetry

Notes

20th-century poetry